Mohammad Salim (born October 15, 1981, Khulna) is a Bangladeshi cricketer who played in two Tests and one One Day International in 2003.

References

1981 births
Living people
Bangladesh Test cricketers
Bangladesh One Day International cricketers
Bangladeshi cricketers
Khulna Division cricketers
University of Calcutta alumni
20th-century Bengalis
21st-century Bengalis
People from Khulna
Wicket-keepers